On Mark Engineering was an American aircraft remanufacturing company established in 1954 at Van Nuys Airport in California. Its most significant products were rebuilding military surplus A-26 Invaders into executive transports—the Marketeer with an unpressurized fuselage and the Marksman with fuselage pressurization. On Mark converted 41 Douglas B-26s into one YB-26K and 40 B-26K Counter-Invaders (later redesignated A-26A) for counterinsurgency missions with the US Air Force. On Mark also undertook conversion work of a Boeing 377 Stratocruiser into the prototype Pregnant Guppy for Aero Spacelines.

Products

 On Mark Executive
 On Mark Marketeer
 On Mark Marksman 
 B-26K Counter-Invader
 Aero Spacelines Pregnant Guppy—prototype only

References

External links

 Marksman by Airscene org uk
 A site on Van Nuys Airport, including On Mark Engineering

Defunct aircraft manufacturers of the United States
Technology companies based in Greater Los Angeles
Manufacturing companies based in Los Angeles
Manufacturing companies established in 1954
Technology companies established in 1954
1954 establishments in California
Defunct manufacturing companies based in Greater Los Angeles